Scott McIlroy (born 1971, Coventry, England), better known as Doc Scott or Nasty Habits, is a British drum and bass DJ and producer.

Biography
He originally started to DJ at clubs and raves such as Amnesia House and The Eclipse in 1989/1990, before appearing all over the country and in the mid 1990s play at the seminal Metalheadz at the Blue Note nights. Goldie has called him "The King of the Rollers".

His first track was "NHS" released on Simon 'Bassline' Smith's label Absolute 2.  From there, he would record classics on labels such as Reinforced Records and Metalheadz, such as "Here Come The Drumz / Dark Angel", "Deranged", "VIP Drumz/Unofficial Ghost", and "Shadow Boxing" (released on his own 31 Records label).

Between 2014 and 2018, he hosted the Future Beats show on Londons Origin FM.

Selected discography

Selected singles/EPs
NHS EP - Surgery (Absolute 2, 1991)
NHS Second Chapter - NHS (Disco Remix) (Absolute 2, 1992)
As Nasty As I Want To Be EP - Here Comes The Drumz/Dark Angel/Mayday/Let's Go (as Nasty Habits) (Reinforced Records, 1992)
Street Knowledge (Reinforced Records, 1993)
Get Busy Cru/Deranged (with Keith Suckling) (Reinforced Records, 1993)
VIP Drumz (Metalheadz, 1993)
Drumz 95/Blue Skies (Metalheadz, 1995)
Far Away/Its Yours (Metalheadz, 1995)
Unofficial Ghost (Metalheadz, 1996)
Tokyo Dawn (Nexus, 1996)
Shadow Boxing/Prototyped (as Nasty Habits) (31 Records, 1996)

Mix compilations
MixMag Live Vol 22: Breakbeat Experiments (MixMag, 1996)

References

External links
 

English record producers
English DJs
English drum and bass musicians
Living people
1969 births
Electronic dance music DJs
Reinforced Records artists